"Be Real" is a song recorded by American singer-songwriter Phoebe Ryan. It was released on September 8, 2017, as the second single from her second extended play, James (2017). Remixes for the single were released the same month.

Composition 
"Be Real" is a synth-pop and hip hop song with a length of three minutes and forty two seconds. The song lyrically talks about wanting honesty in a relationship that no longer feels genuine. The song was penned by Ryan, Kyle Shearer, and Nathaniel Campany, while Valley Girl handled the production of the song.

Critical reception 
Ariella Kozin of We Are the Guard wrote that the song marks a "sweet spot that makes a hit song—it's vulnerable, but not without a glamorous mask."

Track listing

Personnel 
Adapted from Tidal.
 Phoebe Ryan – lead vocals, songwriting
 Kyle Shearer – songwriting, record engineering
 Nathaniel Campany – songwriting
 Valley Girl – production
 Mitch McCarthy – mix engineering
 Justin Shturtz – master engineering

Release history

References 

2017 songs
Columbia Records singles
Songs written by Phoebe Ryan
Songs written by Nate Campany